Kawaihae, an island music band, was formed in Japan in the summer of 2000 by American-born radio personality Vance K (born and raised on the Big Island of Hawaii). The band has released three albums and, as of 2009, was working on a 4th album. The band has a large fanbase within Japan and Hawaii and has received the Group of the Year award at the 2004 Hawaii Music Awards.

Hawaiian music